Shalamar has sold  over 25 million records worldwide. The following is the discography of the band Shalamar:

Albums

Studio albums

Compilation albums

Singles

References

External links

Discography
Rhythm and blues discographies
Discographies of American artists
Pop music group discographies
Disco discographies